Elizabeth Jean Beattie is a former Australian politician. She was a Labor Party member of the Victorian Legislative Assembly from 1999 to 2014. She represented the electorate of Yuroke from 2002; she previously represented the abolished electorate of Tullamarine. She was the Parliamentary Secretary assisting the Premier on Multicultural Affairs and Veteran Affairs in the Brumby Labor Government.

Beattie was born in the Melbourne suburb of Richmond. Prior to entering politics, she worked as an office manager for the Australian Services Union from 1994 to 1996, and as a building manager at Melbourne Trades Hall from 1996 until her election to parliament in 1999. She was also involved in her party's local branches, serving as president of the Labor branch in Sunbury from 1993 to 1998.

Beattie was preselected as the Labor candidate for Tullamarine for the 1999 state election, opposing outspoken conservative Bernie Finn. Finn had won the seat, in a traditionally Labor area, in the huge Labor defeat of 1992, and been re-elected in 1996. She won the seat, and served for five terms before retiring from politics at the 2014 Victorian state election.

References

|-

Living people
Members of the Victorian Legislative Assembly
Australian Labor Party members of the Parliament of Victoria
Women members of the Victorian Legislative Assembly
Australian trade unionists
21st-century Australian politicians
21st-century Australian women politicians
Year of birth missing (living people)
Politicians from Melbourne
People from Richmond, Victoria